The cast of the television series MythBusters perform experiments to verify or debunk urban legends, old wives' tales, and the like. This is a list of the various myths tested on the show as well as the results of the experiments (the myth is busted, plausible, or confirmed).

Episode overview

Episode 95 – "James Bond, Part 1"
 Original air date: January 16, 2008
The MythBusters test various myths inspired by scenes in several James Bond movies.

Electromagnetic Watch

Propane Tank Peril

Speed Boat Survival

Episode 96 – "Lead Balloon"
 Original air date: January 23, 2008

Lead Balloon
The MythBusters, having already put the concrete glider through its paces, test another flight idiom.

Explosive Surfing

Episode 97 – "Airplane on a Conveyor Belt"
 Original air date: January 30, 2008

Airplane on a Conveyor Belt

Shaving Cream in a Car

Cockroaches and Radiation

Episode 98 – "James Bond, Part 2"
 Original air date: February 6, 2008

Exploding Pen

Killer Hat

Jaws of Steel

Martinis: Shaken vs. Stirred
Though this is not actually a myth, the Build Team decided to test why James Bond prefers his martinis "shaken, not stirred."

Episode 99 – "Viewers' Special 2"
 Original air date: February 13, 2008

Ancient Arrows

Tree Machine Gun

Eye Black

Jeans High Wire Escape

Leaking Powder Keg

On the MythBusters fansite, the build team tested another short myth.

Episode 100 – "MacGyver Myths"
 Original air date: February 20, 2008

Sodium Jailbreak

Bamboo Ultralight

MacGyver Challenge
Adam and Jamie were put under a battery of tests to prove that they could match MacGyver's ingenuity. They were not necessarily testing these myths to bust or confirm them, but whether they had the smarts and the ability to make them work without any preparation. In each test, Adam and Jamie had a one-hour time limit and could only use the materials that they were provided by Tory and Grant.

MacGyver Mini Myths
In the weeks before the broadcast of the MacGyver special, the MythBusters were advertising this special using the following mini myths.

Episode 101 – "Alaska Special"
 Original air date: April 23, 2008

The MythBusters went to Alaska as part of the Discovery Channel's Alaska Week.

Dynamite Dog

Cabin Fever

Moose Mayhem

Episode 102 – "Shark Week Special 2"
 Original air date: July 27, 2008

This was a double length episode for Shark Week 2008 in which seven myths were tested.

Eye Gouge

Playing Dead

Animal Magnetism

Dog Bait

Spicy Salsa Shark Shield

Fatal Flashlight

Fish Flap

Shark-Prey Vision
This was a web exclusive mini myth that Kari, Grant, and Tory tested.

Episode 103 – "Exploding Steak"
 Original air date: August 6, 2008

Exploding Meat

Don't Drive Angry

Episode 104 – "NASA Moon Landing"
 Original air date: August 27, 2008
Announced by "This Week at NASA" on NASA TV on February 8, 2008.  "The Marshall Space Flight Center hosted the MythBusters television show.  The MythBusters chose Marshall as one of several NASA locations for an episode to debunk the notion that NASA never landed on the Moon.  The cast conducted tests involving a feather, a weight, a lunar soil boot print, and a flag in a vacuum.  A team of Marshall scientists helped with the tests."

Faked Photos

Vacuum Myths

In order to test these myths, the Build Team made a trip to the Marshall Space Flight Center to use one of their specialized vacuum chambers. The hammer and feather demonstration was not aired in the original episode due to time constraints, but can be seen as a supplement on the MythBusters website.

Slowed Film Fakery

Moon Laser

Episode 105 – "Viral Hour"
 Original air date: September 3, 2008
Despite the fact that most of the myths tested in this episode were confirmed, the MythBusters warned that not all viral videos are what they appear. They posted their version of the hoax Rubik's Cube viral videos online that showed Adam solving a Rubik's Cube with his feet while Jamie solved one blindfolded. In reality, they started with solved cubes and just manipulated them randomly. They then ran the footage backwards in order to give the illusion that they solved the puzzles. The illusion was partially achieved by having a crewmember walk backwards in the background so he would appear to walk normally in the final video.

Fireman's Lift

Fainting Goats

Sawdust Cannon

Invisible Water

iOnion
This was a myth based on a video posted on YouTube website (it was this video created by the user Household Hacker). This myth was cut for time, which was why it was not shown in the actual episode. It was instead posted as a supplement on the MythBusters website.

Episode 106 – "Phone Book Friction"
 Original air date: September 10, 2008

Phone Book Friction

Black Powder Shark
The Build Team received a request to test whether the final scene in the film Deep Blue Sea where the protagonists destroy the last shark with a harpoon gun, some gunpowder, and a car battery, was possible. To test these myths, Tory built a replica shark named "Hugo" out of foam.

Episode 107 – "Water Stun Gun"
 Original air date: September 17, 2008

Water Stun Gun

Fire Fables

Extinguisher Explosion
The Build Team tested whether the following fire extinguishers, if thrown into a fire, will explode and put out the fire.

Fire Walking

Episode 108 – "Blind Driving"
 Original air date: October 8, 2008

Blind Driving

Golf Galore

90% Air

Lightning Cleats

Gopher Goner

Episode 109 – "Ninjas 2"
 Original air date: October 15, 2008

Catching an Arrow
This myth was revisited due to fan complaints that the bow was too close to the arrow catching rig, so the arrow was traveling faster than it would at a farther distance. Fans also pointed out many people who could catch an arrow on camera and wanted the MythBusters to bring one on the show.

Special Forces Ninja's Revenge

Underwater Blow Dart

The One-inch Punch

Episode 110 – "Alcohol Myths"
 Original air date: October 22, 2008

Beer Goggles

Stone Cold Sober
Adam and Jamie tested several alleged methods for sobering up quickly. For each test, one of the co-hosts subjected himself to the remedy while the other did not, and both then traced a line pattern as quickly and accurately as possible. The difference in their performances was taken as the effectiveness of the remedy, although Adam also mentioned at the end of the experiment that their BAC measurements agreed with the differences in their performances as well. They tried to sober up by...

Hwacha
The Hwacha is an ancient rocket launcher built in Korea based on earlier designs of ancient Chinese firearms technology such as the fire arrows that shoots in rapid fire sequence hundreds of rockets at once. The Build Team tested this weapon in 3 parts.

Episode 111 – "Motorcycle Flip"
 Original air date: October 29, 2008

Motor Bike Flip
This is a movie myth based upon a scene in Indiana Jones and the Last Crusade.

Prison Break
The Build Team tested whether or not a person can escape prison (in this case, climbing down the face of the Alameda County Courthouse) by using a rope made out of...

Episode 112 – "Coffin Punch"
 Original air date: November 5, 2008

What is Bulletproof? 2
Adam and Jamie take fan requests and determine if the following objects are bulletproof.

Coffin Punch

Episode 113 – "End With a Bang"
 Original air date: November 12, 2008

Hit the Ground Running

You Can't Polish Poop

Better to End with a Bang

Episode SP12 – "Viewer Special Threequel"
 Original air date: November 19, 2008

Bamboo Torture

Alkali Metal Mayhem

Brandy Warmer

Exploding Piano

Notes

References

External links

 MythBusters Official site
 

2008 American television seasons
2008